Qiubo of Han (Chinese: 韓賕伯; pinyin: Hán Qiú Bó), ancestral name Jī (姬), clan name Hán (韓), personal name unknown, and posthumously known as Qiubo of Han, was the second head of the House of Han. He was the son of Wuzi of Han. Qiubo was succeeded by his son Dingbo of Han.

Ancestors

References

Zhou dynasty nobility
Monarchs of Han (state)